Nahuel Raúl Menéndez (born 5 March 1994) is an Argentine professional footballer who plays as a right-back for Alvarado.

Career
Menéndez spent time in the system of Chacarita Juniors, prior to departing in 2012 to join Sevilla of La Liga. Firstly with the youth team, then with reserve team Sevilla B. He made his debut on 17 February in a Segunda División B win over San Roque. Seven appearances came in 2012–13, while twenty-nine came in 2013–14 and one in 2014–15. In January 2015, Menéndez rejoined Chacarita Juniors. He made his debut for the club on 25 July versus Gimnasia y Esgrima in Primera B Nacional. After fourteen matches in 2015, he went onto score two goals in forty-six appearances in 2016 and 2016–17; the latter ended with promotion.

On 4 January 2019, Menéndez terminated his contract with Chacarita with them back in the second tier. He subsequently joined Primera División side San Martín. In October 2020 Menéndez joined Agropecuario. At the end of December 2021, Menéndez signed with Primera Nacional side Alvarado.

Personal life
Nahuel is the twin brother of fellow footballer Jonathan Menéndez.

Career statistics
.

References

External links

1994 births
Living people
Argentine footballers
Argentine expatriate footballers
Footballers from Buenos Aires
Association football midfielders
Twin sportspeople
Segunda División B players
Primera Nacional players
Argentine Primera División players
Sevilla Atlético players
Chacarita Juniors footballers
San Martín de Tucumán footballers
Club Agropecuario Argentino players
Club Atlético Alvarado players
Expatriate footballers in Spain
Argentine expatriate sportspeople in Spain